Clearfield School District may refer to:
 Clearfield Area School District - Pennsylvania
 Clearfield Community School District - Iowa (defunct)